Lycée Français Bel-Air Garraf, formerly École Française Bel Air is a French international school in Sant Pere de Ribes, Province of Barcelona, Catalonia, Spain. It serves petite section through terminale (final year of lycée, senior high school/sixth form). The classes at the lycée (upper secondary level) are taught with the National Centre for Distance Education (CNED) distance education programme. Garraf is a Catalan comarca.

It was created in 1992. The current campus opened in 1996. The current cycle 3 (years 3–5) primary school building opened in 2004, and an addition for cycle 2 (years 1–2) of primary school was installed in 2008.

Notes

External links
 Lycée Français Bel Air 
 "Bienvenido al Liceo Bel-Air Garraf." Red de Colegios y Liceos Franceses España-Portugal (EFEP) 

French international schools in Spain
International schools in Catalonia
Schools in the Province of Barcelona
Garraf